Bezerk is the second studio album by Welsh glam metal band Tigertailz. It was released on the Music for Nations record label  and is still the band's most successful and well known album, having reached the UK top 40 at number 36. It is the first album to feature new lead vocalist Kim Hooker. The album takes a strongly pop influenced approach to the genre, typical of Tigertailz's sound.

In 2006 Tigertailz released a new album called Bezerk 2.0 which featured similar album art to the original release.

On the 2009/2010 tour, Tigertailz made the choice to perform the whole album on each show.

Track listing
All tracks composed by Ace Finchum, Jay Pepper, Kim Hooker and Pepsi Tate
Side one
 "Sick Sex" - 4:26
 "Love Bomb Baby" - 3:03
 "I Can Fight Dirty Too" - 3:50
 "Noise Level Critical" - 5:23
 "Heaven" - 6:04

Side two
 "Love Overload" - 3:52
 "Action City" - 4:02
 "Twist and Shake" - 3:32
 "Squeeze It Dry" - 4:04
 "Call of the Wild" - 3:58

Personnel

Tigertailz
 Kim Hooker - vocals
 Jay Pepper - guitar, mandolin
 Pepsi Tate - bass
 Ace Finchum - drums

Additional musicians
Don Airey - keyboards, strings arrangements
Tim Lewis - additional keyboards
Glen Thompson - additional percussion
Peter Goalby, John Blood - backing vocals
London SSO - strings

Production
Chris Tsangarides - producer, engineer
Gordon Bonnar, Nick Blundell, Tim Lewis - engineers

1990 albums
Tigertailz albums
Albums produced by Chris Tsangarides
Music for Nations albums